Martin Joseph Walsh (born April 10, 1967) is an American politician and union official. He served as the 29th United States secretary of labor between 2021 and 2023. A Democrat, he previously served as the 54th mayor of Boston from 2014, until resigning in 2021 after being confirmed by the United States Senate to serve as secretary of labor in the cabinet of President Joe Biden. Before his mayoralty, he served as a member of the Massachusetts House of Representatives, representing the 13th Suffolk district from 1997 until 2014.

Early life and education
Walsh was born in Dorchester, Boston, to John Walsh, an Irish American originally from Callowfeenish, a townland near Carna, County Galway, and Mary (née O'Malley), from Rosmuc. The couple emigrated separately but married in the United States in 1959. His parents both left from Shannon Airport, with his father leaving in 1956 and his mother leaving in 1959.

Walsh grew up in the Savin Hill area of Boston's Dorchester neighborhood. He was diagnosed with Burkitt's lymphoma at age 7, forcing him to miss most of second and third grade and repeat fifth grade. At age 11, after going through years of chemotherapy, a scan revealed no traces of the cancer. He went to high school at The Newman School. He initially dropped out of college. He later took night classes as an adult, and received a Bachelor of Arts degree in social science from the Woods College of Advancing Studies at Boston College in 2009.

Trade union work
Walsh joined the Laborers' Union Local 223 at age 21 and served as the union's president from his time in the state legislature until he became the mayor of Boston.

He was elected secretary-treasurer and general agent of the Boston Metropolitan District Building Trades Council, a union umbrella group, in the fall of 2010. In 2011, Walsh was named head of Boston Building Trades. He resigned in 2013 when he announced he was running for mayor.

State representative

Walsh was elected to the Massachusetts House of Representatives in 1997. He represented the 13th district of Suffolk County, which includes Dorchester and one precinct in Quincy. He was the chairman of the Committee on Ethics, and served as a co-chair of the Massachusetts Democratic Party Labor Caucus.

During his tenure he served as the co-chair for the Special Commission on Public Construction Reform. He also served as chair of the House Homeland Security and Federal Affairs Committee, as well as the chair of the House Committee on Ethics. He served as vice chair of the Joint Committee on Consumer Protection and Professional Licensure, as well as the vice chair of the Joint Committee on Municipalities and Regional Government. Other committees he served on included the Joint Committee on Banks and Banking; Joint Committee on Environment, Natural Resources and Agriculture; Joint Committee on Health Care; Joint Committee on the Judiciary; Joint Committee on Mental Health and Substance Abuse, Joint Committee on Public Safety; House Personnel and Administration Committee; and House Steering, Policy and Scheduling Committee.

On February 13, 2013, Walsh introduced a bill to have The Modern Lovers song "Roadrunner" be named the official rock song of Massachusetts. The song's writer, Jonathan Richman, came out against this, saying, "I don't think the song is good enough to be a Massachusetts song of any kind."

Mayoralty

Elections

2013 mayoral election 

In April 2013, Walsh announced he would run for Mayor of Boston in the 2013 mayoral election. He resigned the Trades Council position in April 2013 after formally announcing his bid for mayor.

Walsh campaigned on the promise to champion a 24-hour Boston, including extending the hours of operation of the "T" into the night. The MBTA answers to the Massachusetts Department of Transportation, which is a state and not city agency, but Walsh campaigned on the promise to extend MBTA service thanks to his tenure in the state house. "As a 16-year veteran of the House," he said, "I am uniquely qualified to negotiate transportation plans with the legislature."

On September 24, 2013, Walsh received a plurality of the vote, among twelve candidates in the mayoral preliminary election, with 18.4% of the vote. As a result, he advanced to the general election, facing second place vote-getter Boston City Councilor John R. Connolly, who received 17.2% of the vote. Walsh defeated Connolly in the general election on November 5, 2013, with 51.5% of the vote, compared to Connolly's 48.1%.

Walsh received strong funding from trade unions.
Andrew Ryan of Boston.com wrote that the general election featured very few policy differences, and that Walsh won, in part, by projecting an "everyman" image and sharing a "compelling life story" involving his immigrant roots, childhood battle with cancer, and his battle with alcoholism. Ryan also credited the general election endorsements of eliminated mayoral candidates John Barros, Felix G. Arroyo, and Charlotte Golar Richie as helping Walsh to overcome Connolly's initial polling lead.

Among the factors credited for his victory over Connolly in the general election was a last-minute half-million dollars in television advertising against Connolly and in support of Walsh, secretly funded by the Boston Teachers Union. Connolly was a supporter of charter schools, and his education reform proposals had run into opposition from the union.

Walsh was sworn in as mayor on January 6, 2014.

2017 mayoral election

In July 2017, Walsh announced he would seek a second term in the 2017 mayoral election. On September 26, 2017, he received 62% of the vote in the preliminary election. He advanced to the general election and faced second place vote-getter, Boston City Councilor Tito Jackson, who had received 29% of the vote. Walsh defeated Jackson in the general election held on November 7, with 65% of the vote, compared to Jackson's 34%.

Walsh was sworn in for his second term on January 1, 2018; then-former vice-president Joe Biden presided at the ceremony.

Appointments and staffing decisions
Soon after taking office, Walsh appointed a number of individuals to his staff. This included Joyce Linehan as his chief of policy. He hired Eugene O'Flaherty as the city's corporation counsel. Walsh also appointed William B. Evans the permanent commissioner of the Boston Police Department. Walsh also reappointed a number of cabinet chiefs from his predecessor, Tom Menino's, administration.

In his first term, Walsh created some new positions and departments within the mayor's office. In February 2014, he appointed John Barros as the city's first-ever chief of economic development. In December 2014, he created the Office of Diversity, headed by a chief diversity officer.

Development and zoning
Walsh was seen as friendly towards real estate developers throughout his mayoralty, and Boston underwent a substantial building boom during his seven years in office. During the course of his mayoralty, officials in Boston granted approval to 7.7 million square feet of real estate developments, including more than 40,000 more housing units.

In December 2020, after it was advanced by a vote of the Boston City Council, Walsh announced that the city would become the first major United States city to put "affirmatively furthering fair housing" requirements into its zoning code. In January 2021, the Boston Zoning Commission unanimously voted to add them to the city's zoning code, and Walsh signed it into effect that month.

Economic matters
After Walsh left office, the editorial board of The Boston Globe would opine that, as mayor, Walsh, "kept Boston on an even keel financially and invited economic growth".

In March 2015, Walsh and Councilor Michelle Wu co-authored an op-ed in The Boston Globe calling paid parental leave, "a must for working families". Roughly a month later the Boston City Council passed a paid parental leave ordinance that was authored by Wu. The ordinance provided city employees with six weeks of paid parental leave after childbirth, stillbirth, or adoption. Walsh signed the ordinance into law in May.

In January 2016, Boston struck a deal for General Electric to move their headquarters to the city. The city, together with the state government of Massachusetts, offered General Electric a combined $140 million in business incentives ($120 million in grants, and $25 million in city tax relief). Some critics argued that Boston had given General Electric a "sweetheart deal". However, The Boston Globe jointly named four deputies of Walsh and Governor Charlie Baker who had been involved in striking the deal as their "Bostonians of the Year" for their roles in the deal.

In April 2016, Walsh came out in support of having Massachusetts implement a gradual increase of its minimum wage to $15.

Education
A 2020 state audit of Boston Public Schools found the city to lack any, "clear, coherent, district-wide strategy for supporting low-performing schools."

After the end of his tenure as mayor, the editorial board of The Boston Globe heavily criticized Walsh's leadership on education, writing, 

Towards the end of 2014, Walsh proposed and negotiated a 40 minute extension to the school day of Boston Public Schools, which was implemented.

Environmental matters

In 2015, Walsh launched the Climate Ready Boston initiative to prepare Boston for the effects of climate change.

Walsh served in the leadership of C40 Cities Climate Leadership Group.

In 2017, Walsh spoke in opposition to President Donald Trump's decision to withdraw the United States from the Paris Agreement.

In 2016, Walsh's administration opposed a proposed plastic bag ban that was debated by the Boston City Council in 2016. However, in December 2017, Walsh signed into law a plastic bag ban authored by City Councilors Michelle Wu and Matt O'Malley.

Homelessness
On October 8, 2014, Walsh, citing the advisement of various City departments, agencies and leaders, and the Massachusetts Department of Transportation, ordered the closure of the Long Island Bridge (due to disrepair), and the evacuation of the programs for the homeless located on Long Island. Later that year, Walsh unveiled plans to renovate a facility to house hundreds of homeless people displaced due to the closure of the Long Island Bridge.

In his 2018 second mayoral inauguration address, Walsh announced establishment of the Boston's Way Home Fund, with the aim of raising $10 million to establish 200 units of permanent supportive housing for the chronically homeless. The fund met its $10 million goal in 2020, two years earlier than its target.

In November 2019, Walsh announced that the city had obtained a $4.7 million grant from the United States Department of Housing and Urban Development that would go towards housing homeless youth. In March 2020, Walsh announced that the city had secured hundreds in additional interim bed capacity to house homeless.

While Walsh, in 2019, outlined plans to deal with the homelessness crisis on Boston's so-called "Methadone Mile" (also known as "Mass & Cass" for the intersection of Massachusetts Avenue and Melena Cass Boulevard), it persisted to be a problem when he left office in 2021.

Olympic bid

Boston was originally selected as the United States' bid city for the 2024 Summer Olympics. Walsh supported the bid. In October 2014, Walsh had signed a letter stating that he would sign the Host City Contract without reservation; however, in July 2015, he stated that he was not comfortable signing the financial guarantee in its current form at that time. This was one of a number of events that led to the cancelation of Boston's bid for the Olympics on July 27, 2015.

Policing
Soon after taking office, Walsh appointed William B. Evans the permanent commissioner of the Boston Police Department. In 2018, Walsh appointed William G. Gross as commissioner, making Gross the first African American individual to hold the position. In January 2021, amid Gross' retirement, Walsh made Dennis White, also African American, the new commissioner of the Boston Police Department. Days after appointing White, Walsh suspended him pending an investigation into allegations of domestic violence.

While Walsh was initially hesitant to implement police body cameras, in 2016 his administration launched a body camera pilot program. Walsh allotted $2 million of the 2019 city budget to fund a police body camera program.

During the George Floyd protests, Boston area activists called on Walsh to reduce spending on Boston Police Department by at least 10% for the 2021 fiscal budget. Walsh instead diverted $12 million from police overtime spending, less than 3% of the overall department budget. Ultimately, the department overspent that year's overtime budget.

In June 2020, Walsh created the Boston Police Reform Taskforce. In October 2020, he pledged to adopt all of the final recommendations that the taskforce had made. In January 2021, he signed into law an ordinance that created a police accountability office, one of the recommendations the taskforce had made.

In January 2021, Walsh vetoed an ordinance that would have limited the use of tear gas, pepper spray, and rubber bullets by the Boston Police Department, calling into question the "practicality and potential consequences" of the proposals in the ordinance. He also argued that it infringed on the authority of the police commissioner.

Social issues
Under Walsh, the city of Boston took part in the My Brother's Keeper Challenge. In 2014, Walsh vetoed an ordinance by the Boston City Council to create a commission on Black men and boys, claiming that he did so because such a commission would, "duplicate and complicate efforts that my administration is already engaged in", and that the ordinance was written in such a way that he believed it would violate the city charter.

In a speech given on January 25, 2017, Walsh reaffirmed Boston's status as a sanctuary city for people living in the country without documentation. The address was given in the same week that President Donald Trump threatened to pull federal funding to cities that have a policy of protecting illegal immigrants by not prosecuting them for violating federal immigration laws. A defiant Walsh said: "If people want to live here, they'll live here. They can use my office. They can use any office in this building."

In April 2017, Walsh announced that he would create a new Office of Women's Advancement.

In June 2020, Walsh declared racism to be a public health crisis. That month, in an effort to address institutional racism, Walsh announced he would create an "equity and inclusion cabinet" in his administration, launch a racial equity fund, and declared his intent to pursue a new zoning amendment aimed at addressing the issue of resident displacement. The racial equity fund launched months later, with Walsh stating it would invest in nonprofits that, "empower Black and brown residents in economic development, in public health, in youth employment, in education, in the arts, and other areas."

COVID-19 pandemic

Walsh was mayor during the first year of the COVID-19 pandemic. During the course of the pandemic, Walsh regularly updated the public using social media, robocalls, and text alerts.

On March 14, 2020 Walsh declared a municipal state of emergency regarding the pandemic. Under Walsh, the city put in place restrictions aimed at stymieing the spread of the COVID-19 virus. Walsh urged Bostonians to adhere to social distancing guidelines, and made efforts to limit public activity. Days after declaring a state of emergency, he suspended all construction projects and closing all of the Boston Public Library locations and city community centers. In March, the City of Boston also closed all playgrounds at its parks.

On April 5, 2020, Walsh issued an advisory that individuals leaving their place of residence to wear masks or other facial coverings. At the same time, he also announced an interim 9pm recommended curfew, and the interim closure of all recreation sports areas at city parks.

In early April, a field hospital was erected at the Boston Convention and Exhibition Center.

On March 16, 2020, Walsh announced the Boston Resiliency Fund, a city-led fundraising effort to support programs and charities serving those impacted by the pandemic. Walsh established the Boston Rental Relief Fund in April 2020, using $3 million of city funds. The fund, using city dollars, would provide aid to those at risk of losing their rental residences amid the pandemic. He later added an additional $5 million in June 2020.

Due to the pandemic, in 2020, Walsh extended the due date for property tax bills from May 1 to June 1, and waived the interest fees on delayed payments of motor vehicle and property taxes.

Walsh canceled the 2020 edition of the Boston Marathon, after having first postponed it, due to pandemic concerns.

In 2020, the city expedited licensing to allow outdoor dining for restaurants as part of a COVID-19 reopening plan. The city's outdoor dining program returned in 2021.

In October 2020, amid a rise in cases, he launched an initiative to encourage all Bostonians to take a COVID-19 tests, including providing all city employees eligible for benefits with one paid hour every other week to get tested.

During the 2020 winter holiday season, he warned Bostonians against holding holiday parties.

Other matters
Walsh worked with Councilor Ayanna Pressley on an ordinance requiring municipal trucks to have side-guards in order to protect cyclists. It passed unanimously in the City Council in November 2014.

In January 2015, Walsh filed a lawsuit in an effort to stop a casino from being built in nearby Everett, Massachusetts. He dropped his legal objections in January 2016, after striking a deal between the city of Boston and Wynn Resorts, who were behind the Everett casino project.

Walsh was a prominent opponent of the legalization of recreational cannabis in Massachusetts ahead of the vote on 2016 Massachusetts Question 4.

Walsh supported an ordinance in the city council which regulated short-term rental of housing units. It passed in the City Council, and he signed it into law in June 2018. The ordinance restricted short-term rentals to owner-occupied housing units, required hosts to register with the city, and required the city to collect and publish data on short-term rentals. Airbnb sued the city over the ordinance; the suit was settled in August 2019 with an agreement which included having Airbnb hosts in Boston enter their ordinance-required city-issued registration number into the website, or face having their listings removed from the website.

In July 2020, construction began on a remodel of City Hall Plaza, which Walsh had been working planning on for years.

In 2016, Walsh announced goals to increase minority participation in municipal contracts. However, in 2021, a study completed for the city by BBC Research & Consulting found that, during Walsh's first term, only 2.5% of the $2.1 billion in city contracts awarded during Walsh's first term were awarded to minority-owned businesses, and only 8.5% went to businesses owned by women. In February 2021, Walsh signed an executive order making it a stated goal for 25% of city contracts to be awarded to businesses owned by people of color or women.

Resignation
Walsh resigned as mayor on March 22, 2021, the same day that he was confirmed for his position in the Cabinet of Joe Biden. Kim Janey, president of the Boston City Council, became acting mayor upon Walsh's resignation.

Secretary of Labor

On January 7, 2021, Walsh was nominated by President Joe Biden to serve as Secretary of Labor. On February 11, 2021, the United States Senate Committee on Health, Education, Labor and Pensions voted to move Walsh's confirmation forward to a full Senate vote. The nomination was confirmed by the United States Senate on March 22, 2021, by a vote of 68–29. He was the final department secretary of Biden's Cabinet to be confirmed. The day after being confirmed, he was sworn in by Vice President Kamala Harris.

Walsh is the first Cabinet secretary to openly be in a twelve-step program for recovery from addiction. As secretary, amid a national rise in addiction, Walsh has discussed his own experience with alcoholism, and has participated in addiction-related events. Walsh is also the first former union leader to serve in the position in roughly 45 years.

Ben Penn of Bloomberg Law reported that, as labor secretary, Walsh lobbied trade unions not to criticize the prospective appointment of David Weil, which helped to clear the path for Biden to nominate Weil to serve as the administrator of the Wage and Hour Division.

In October 2021, Walsh and Vice President Kamala Harris announced new  guidelines aimed at encouraging more federal workers to join trade unions, with the objective of boosting the collective bargaining powers of American trade unions.

On February 7, 2023, it was reported that Walsh would leave the Cabinet to become head of the NHLPA, the NHL players' union.. He was formally appointed to the role on February 16, 2023.

Personal life

Walsh resides in the Lower Mills neighborhood of Dorchester with his longtime girlfriend Lorrie Higgins. He is a recovering alcoholic. By the time he ran for mayor in 2013, he was eighteen years sober in a twelve-step program.

Walsh has been a season ticket holder of the NFL's New England Patriots since franchise owner Robert Kraft bought the team in 1994.

He is a Roman Catholic. He speaks Irish and holds both American and Irish citizenship.

Electoral history

Massachusetts House of Representatives

Boston Mayor

See also
 Timeline of Boston, 2010s
 List of mayors of the 50 largest cities in the United States

References

External links

 Biography at the United States Department of Labor
 Marty Walsh for Mayor campaign website

"America's 11 Most Interesting Mayors" from Politico magazine

|-

|-

|-

1967 births
21st-century American politicians
American people of Irish descent
Biden administration cabinet members
Boston College alumni
Catholics from Massachusetts
Living people
Mayors of Boston
Democratic Party members of the Massachusetts House of Representatives
People from Dorchester, Massachusetts
Politicians from Boston
Trade unionists from Massachusetts
United States Secretaries of Labor
Biden administration personnel